The San Juan Capistrano Stakes is  a Grade III American  thoroughbred horse race for horses age three and older over a distance of  run on the turf track held at Santa Anita Park in Arcadia, California in June. The event currently offers a purse of $100,000. It is one of the longest Graded grass race in America.

History

The event was inaugurated on 9 March 1935, when Head Play defeated Top Row and Ladysman on a muddy track by 2 lengths in a time of 1:51 before a crowd of 45,000 on the closing day of Santa Anita meeting. In 1937 an even greater crowd came to witness Seabiscuit set a new track record for the  miles winning by 7 lengths. The event in 1940 only it was limited to three-year-olds and for three-year-olds and older in all other years prior to 1968.

From its inception through 1953, the race was contested on dirt, then in 1954 it was converted to a turf event.

The San Juan Capistrano is run around four turns, and begins at the top of Santa Anita's downhill chute, normally used for -furlong sprint races. From the start point, horses begin their descent down the hill. Within the first two furlongs of the race, horses turn right – one of only two locations in North American horse racing that a right turn is used (the other is at Kentucky Downs). After a brief straight run, there is a gentle turn to the left until the horses cross the dirt course and enter the main turf oval. Horses then run one full lap of the turf course to complete the  distance. In 2016 the Santa Anita's downhill chute was under repair, and the race was run on the flat turf oval, at  miles.

In 1964, the San Juan Capistrano Handicap was run in two divisions.  

In 1965 the became an invitational event and was named the San Juan Capistrano Invitational Handicap.

With the increasing emphasis on speed horses bred to compete in the Kentucky Derby and Breeders' Cup Classic distance of  miles on dirt, during the last two decades longer races run on grass or dirt in North America have been in decline. Once a Grade I event, the about  miles San Juan Capistrano Invitational Handicap now holds a Grade III classification. Since 2007, the winner of the San Juan Capistrano has received ballot-free entry into Australia's greatest horse race and the staying championship of the world, the Melbourne Cup. Since 2008, no San Juan Capistrano winner has made the trip to Flemington for the Melbourne Cup.

The event was downgraded to a Grade II in 2004 and to a Grade III race in 2015.

The event for many runnings was held on the closing day of the Santa Anita spring meeting, which was in April. However, with the takeover of events from the close of Hollywood Park Racetrack in 2013, the event has been held in June, with three-year-olds allowed to enter.

At age eight, Niarkos (1968) and Mashkour (1991) are the oldest horses to win the event.

Two mares have won the event, La Zanzara (1975) and the Champion Argentine mare Miss Grillo (1949).

The event had showcased many a champion and notable runnings. In 1950 the Irish-bred champion Noor defeated the 1948 Triple Crown champion Citation by a neck before a crowd of about 60,000.

The March 12, 1966, edition of the San Juan Capistrano Invitational Handicap was seen by 60,792 fans, the largest crowd of the season, who turned out to say farewell to retiring U.S. Racing Hall of Fame jockey Johnny Longden. Without ever using the whip as he always did, Longden guided Canadian bred George Royal from fifteen lengths back in last place to a photo-finish win.

Records
Speed record:
 2:42.96 –  Bienamado  (2001)

Margins:

 7 lengths – Fly Till Dawn (1992)
 7 lengths – Lehmi Gold (1982)
 7 lengths – Seabiscuit (1937)

Most wins:
 2 – Mioland (1940, 1941)
 2 – Intent (1952, 1953)
 2 – George Royal (1965, 1966)
 2 –  Niarkos  (1967, 1968)
 2 –  T. H. Approval  (2005, 2006)
 2 –  Bourbon Bay  (2010, 2012)

Most wins by a jockey:
 5 – Johnny Longden (1950, 1951, 1955, 1965, 1966)
 5 – Bill Shoemaker (1961, 1962, 1970, 1971, 1978)

Most wins by a trainer:
 14 – Charles Whittingham (1957, 1959, 1970, 1971, 1972, 1975, 1978, 1981, 1983, 1984, 1985, 1986, 1987, 1989)

Most wins by an owner:
 4 – Charles S. Howard (1937, 1940, 1941, 1950)

Winners

 
 

Notes:

§ Ran as part of an entry

‡ Run 259 feet short of  miles 1997–2001

See also
 List of American and Canadian Graded races

Other North American Marathon races
On dirt: 
 Gallant Man Handicap
 Brooklyn Handicap
 Fort Harrod Stakes
 Tokyo City Cup
 Valedictory Stakes

On turf:
 Canadian International Stakes
 Carleton F. Burke Handicap

External links
 The 2008 San Juan Capistrano Invitational Handicap at the NTRA

References

Horse races in California
Santa Anita Park
Graded stakes races in the United States
Open long distance horse races
Turf races in the United States
Recurring sporting events established in 1935
Grade 3 stakes races in the United States
1935 establishments in California